Rodrigo Rodrigues  is a Brazilian filmmaker, actor, theatre director, theatrical producer, film producer, set and costume designer, and author based in London, United Kingdom. Rodrigues developed a facial expression technique for actors that was taught in workshops at the Gaiety School of Acting and was the basis for his book Facial Expression for the Actor. He created the Irish theatre group The Dublin Core and won the Irish Times Theatre Awards for best costume designer for the play The Trojan Women, which used costumes made from recycled materials.

Early life and education
Rodrigues was born in São Paulo, Brazil, with Spanish, Portuguese and Italian origins. He was introduced to the performing arts by his mother, Terezinha Benatti, at age seven and began to regularly perform at the school theatre by eleven years old. In 1993, he attended drama school Escola de Arte Dramática de Jundiaí.  

Rodrigues completed acting courses at Teatro Escola Claudio Melo from 1997 to 1998. In 1999, Rodrigues closed his Art Espace to continue studies in the arts including enrollment into Escola de Teatro Ewerton de Castro. Rodrigues studied filmmaking at the Irish Film Academy. He also studied at the Kazuo Ohno dance studio, Hodogaya in Yokohama, Japan, to develop his studies of Butoh.

Career

Acting

Theatre
Rodrigues has performed and produced various plays in his career since the age of 7, including The Bacchae, which was directed by José Celso Martinez Corrêa, a Brazilian actor, playwright and director. He also starred in the pilot multimedia play Action Movie alongside Laurence Kinlan.

Rodrigues toured with the Big Telly Theatre Company, a professional theatre company in Northern Ireland, and played the role of Sinbad at the Water Show as well as in the musical, directed by Zoe Seaton and Paul Boyd. During that time he was invited to act in the film The Looking Glass. Rodrigues performed in the play The Indian Wants The Coombe, an adaptation of The Indian Wants the Bronx by Israel Horovitz at the Dublin Fringe Festival. Rodrigues has also performed in A Queda Para O Alto, Oscar Wilde's Salome, Molière's The Miser and The Tempest, by William Shakespeare. He also has credits in The Hostage by Brendan Behan and The Plague by Albert Camus.

Film and TV

Rodrigues has been a film maker, actor, director, script writer and costume in the film and television industry. Rodrigues appeared in the Irish drama serial Fair City and Flight of the Earls with Academy Award nominee Stephen Rea. He also developed the concept and directed the music video for DJ Tocadisco and co-produced and starred in a Felix da Housecat music video.

In 2005, Rodrigues starred in the film Paranoia, a horrific portrait of man himself which was screened at Cork Film Festival and won Best Photography at Portobello Film Festival. In 2007, Rodrigues starred alongside Rachel Rath, Tatiana Fellipo, Michael Parle and the fantastical entity Popeye from "Tales of My Spinach" which went to the Jameson Dublin International Film Festival.

In 2011, Rodrigues portrayed the character Max in The Looking Glass, a film by Colin Downey, alongside Natalia Kostrzewa, Patrick O`Donell, Michael Parle and Eddie Webber. In 2014, he was in the cast of Londinium alongside Brian Croucher. In 2015, Rodrigues appeared in the films 1603 and The Levellers starring Shane Hart, Jadey Duffield and Brian Croucher. He also contributed as a costume designer to Londinium, 1603, and The Levellers.

In 2016, Rodrigues was announced to play the role of The fantasist in Roth, alongside BAFTA winner Patrick Bergin. Rodrigues directed his first feature film Goitaca, to be released in 2020, with City of God`s Leandro Firmino, Lady Francisco, Marlon Blue, Luciano Szafir and Christianne Oliveira.

Teaching
In 1997, Rodrigues opened Espaço Cultural Porão, a cultural college of art space containing four floors with available rooms to create and experiment with various art forms. In 2002, Rodrigues taught one of his own acting techniques, Facial Expressions For Actors, to the students at the Gaiety School of Acting, which included Aidan Turner from The Hobbit. Rodrigues created, managed and taught the theatre group The Dublin Core, an Irish Times Theatre Awards winning Theatre Group. Rodrigues teaches film making workshops every year at Rodrigo Rodrigues Studios in Paraty, Brazil, which includes acting, sets, props and costume making.

Ko Method

The spiritual science of acting
Rodrigues developed the Ko Method, a technique that gives actors an understanding of constructing a range of diverse characters. The technique is based on a scientific and spiritual approach towards the study of universal understanding. It also focuses on human body mechanisms and the experimentation partial movements to find understanding and connectivity within the totality of life's mechanism.

Facial expressions for actors
The objective of this technique is for an individual to learn how to control their reality in relation to movement, explanation, wording and speech.

Rodrigues`s book Facial Expressions for Actors provides analysis of different points of view and perspective from around the world in search of something hidden that requires investigation and reasoning. This groundbreaking method which has been scientifically proven shows that when licking one's arm, the subject becomes more self confident. The book explains that through the development of facial muscles, individuals reach understanding of the universe and learn to access a state of equilibrium within one's own interpretation of their own sybaritic self.

Rodrigues observed that the understanding of an individual's expression required a hidden knowledge which inspired him to search for the development of concrete points in association with the understanding of human nature. Approaching art from a spiritual and scientific point of view, he began with an objective idea that there are important understandings that have been excluded and should be included to the infinitive art of representation. He found that his research was related to science as he studied anatomy, dramaturgy and occasional points of life. Rodrigues initially, self-experimented his findings and techniques and expanded the study to volunteers.

Rodrigo Rodrigues Studios
In 2010, Rodrigo Rodrigues Studios, previously called Paraty Studios, was founded by Rodrigues with the help of Fergal Fitzgerald. A visionary film making space, open for all kinds of visionary art, located in the middle of the Atlantic forest in Brazil. All sets, costumes and props are made of recycled and organic materials to support life on earth which is part of Rodrigues´s environment activism and human development to educate locals and visitors on how to live with respect towards planet Earth. The accommodations were part of Rodrigo Rodrigues Studios´s previous film pilot sets recycled and transformed into wood cabins and tree houses for actors, crew and visitors during their stay. The studio will release its new feature film Goitaca in 2020, in which all sets and costumes have been made out of recycled and organic materials.

Rodrigues used recycled and organic materials to build characters for a pilot film project. Currupira, which starred Brazilian actress Lisa Negri, had been approved for funding by the Ministry of Culture in Brazil and registered at the National Library of Brazil. During his three years in the jungle, Rodrigues worked on set and costume making and dedicated time to writing, experimenting, and building characters. Rodrigues ecological approach to costuming technique was mentioned in Brazilian media, including Veja and ISTOÉ.

Awards
In 1993, Rodrigues received the award for best actor at the Monologue Festival at the Escola de Artes Dramáticas Jundiaí for his performance in Fafa Volte Para Seu Chico.

In 1998, Rodrigues received the Best Theatre Production award from the Cultural Map Awards of the government of São Paulo State for his play Mitos e Lendas, which he wrote, directed, produced and performed.

The DENETRAN Brazilian National Awards awarded Rose Cereser the Best Project Award in 2001 for Amigos do trânsito, which Rodrigo directed, acted and presented.

Rose Cereser received the National Volvo Award for Best Education Traffic Program in 2002 for Amigos do trânsito Group Work for Theatre, TV Program, and Advertising where Rodrigo was a director, actor and presenter.

In 2010, Rodrigues received the Irish Times Theatre Awards at the Smock Alley Theatre for Best Costume Designer for The Trojan Women, which was directed by Rodrigues and co-directed by Alan King.

As an environmental activist he founded Rodrigo Rodrigues Studios located in his self owned protected jungle, in Paraty, Brazil where he dedicates his entire work creation to visionary film making and visionary arts. All of his production costumes, sets and props are made of recycled and organic materials collected from streets, beaches and jungles, to support and preserve life on Earth.

Filmography

Discography

Awards and nominations

References

External links
 
 

1976 births
Living people
Acting theorists
Brazilian male film actors
Male actors from São Paulo
Writers from São Paulo
People from Paraty